The Best of Jay Sean is the third compilation album by British R&B singer Jay Sean. The album was released in Japan on 22 February 2012 by Victor Entertainment. The album features guest appearances from Thara, Lil Wayne, Craig David, Sean Paul, Lil Jon and Sway.

Track listing

References

2012 compilation albums
Jay Sean albums
Cash Money Records compilation albums